Primula kisoana, the hardy primrose or Mount Kiso primrose, is a species of flowering plant in the family Primulaceae, native to Honshu and Shikoku islands of Japan. Hardy to USDA zone 4, it does well in partly shady situations under trees and along paths. A number of cultivars with flowers of different shades of pink are available.

References

kisoana
Endemic flora of Japan
Plants described in 1867